Jonathan Torres may refer to:

 Jonathan Torres (footballer, born 1977), Spanish forward for UD Lanzarote
 Jonathan Torres (footballer, born 1983), Argentine forward for Club Atlético Colegiales (Argentina)
 Jonathan Torres (footballer, born 1989), Colombian defender for Deportivo Cali
 Jonathan Torres (footballer, born 1996), Argentine forward for Club Almagro
 Jonathan Torres (Jiu Jitsu practitioner), Puerto Rican American Brazilian Jiu-Jitsu practitioner